The Dikhow River is a left tributary of the Brahmaputra River in the Indian state of Assam. It rises in the Zunheboto district in Nagaland, flows through the Sivasagar district of Assam and joins the Brahmaputra at Dikhowmukh.

References 

Rivers of Assam
Rivers of India